The Battle of Suez  occurred in 1541 and was a failed attack by the Portuguese against the Ottomans.

In 1541 the Portuguese fleet under the command of the Portuguese governor of India Estevao da Gama and his brother Cristóvão da Gama penetrated into the Red Sea. The Portuguese fleet consisted of 80 ships and 2,300 soldiers. After sacking Suakin, the governor detached 16 light oarvessels and 250 picked men. The aim was to attack Suez but the attack was a failure as the heavy defence as well as the opposition of Davud Pasha and the Ottoman artillery forced the Portuguese to retreat.

For the duration of the 1541 Suez campaign, the Portuguese remained within the Red Sea for seven months, never being confronted by the Ottoman navy, while Muslim trade was paralized.

See also
Battle of Suakin (1541)
Battle of El Tor
Attack on Jeddah (1541)

References

Battles involving the Ottoman Empire
1541 in military history
1541 in the Ottoman Empire
1541 in the Portuguese Empire